Time To Go - The Southern Psychedelic Moment: 1981-86 is a compilation album released in 2012 by recording label Flying Nun Records, compiled and curated by Bruce Russell.

Track listing
The Pin Group - Jim - 05:08
The Clean - In The Back - 01:56
Playthings - Sit Down - 02:15
The Gordons - I Just Can't Stop - 02:35
The Builders - Russian Rug - 06:49
Victor Dimisich Band - It's Cold Outside - 04:24
Tall Dwarfs - Clover - 02:08
The Chills - Flamethrower - 03:15
25 Cents - Don't Deceive Me - 02:34
The Stones - Down And Around - 05:14
The Great Unwashed - Obscurity Blues - 03:06
Sneaky Feelings - Not To Take Sides - 04:49
Scorched Earth Policy - Since The Accident - 03:22
The Shallows - Trial By Separation - 04:27
Look Blue Go Purple - As Does The Sun - 03:12
The Puddle - Junk - 03:07
Max Block - Psychic Discharge - 01:22
Wreck Small Speakers On Expensive Stereos - Rain - 02:17
The DoubleHappys - Some Fantasy - 04:35
The Rip - Wrecked Wee Hymn - 05:27

References

Compilation albums by New Zealand artists
Flying Nun Records compilation albums
2012 compilation albums